Tsai Meng-lin (born 21 March 1978) is a retired Taiwanese athlete who specialised in the sprinting events. He represented his country at the 2001 and 2011 World Championships.

His personal bests are 10.29 seconds in the 100 metres (+1.4 m/s, Banchiao 2006) and 20.88 seconds in the 200 metres (+1.8 m/s, Kaohsiung 2002).

Competition record

References

1978 births
Living people
Taiwanese male sprinters
Asian Games medalists in athletics (track and field)
Athletes (track and field) at the 2002 Asian Games
Athletes (track and field) at the 2006 Asian Games
Athletes (track and field) at the 2010 Asian Games
World Athletics Championships athletes for Chinese Taipei
Asian Games silver medalists for Chinese Taipei
Medalists at the 2010 Asian Games